Zachary Anton John Jeacock (born 8 May 2001) is an English professional footballer who plays as a goalkeeper for  club Birmingham City. He previously spent time on loan at Stourport Swifts of the Midland League Premier Division, National League North club Gloucester City and Salford City of League Two. In international football, he has represented England at under-19 level.

Early life and club career
Jeacock was born in Birmingham and lived in Chaddesley Corbett, Worcestershire, where he attended Winterfold House preparatory school before moving on to nearby Bromsgrove School. He played football as an attacking midfielder or striker for West Hagley F.C. before, a few days after his eighth birthday in May 2009, becoming the then youngest boy to sign for Birmingham City. He went on to compete for Birchfield Harriers as a sprinter, and played football as a defender, only converting to goalkeeper at the age of 14.

Birmingham City
Jeacock took up a two-year scholarship with Birmingham City's Academy in July 2017. He went on to make ten appearances for Birmingham's development squad team in the 2018–19 season as they finished as runners-up in the Professional Development League northern section and lost out to Leeds United on penalties for the overall title. He was offered a three-year deal in March 2019, and signed it in May. His apprenticeship went well off the field as well: he achieved top grades in his BTEC course, was selected in League Football Education's Team of the Year, and was described by Birmingham City's Head of Education and Welfare, Mark Sinclair, as "an excellent ambassador for the football club, and somebody who has embraced all aspects of his apprenticeship, with him maximising his opportunities to continually develop himself and others."

In August 2019, Jeacock joined National League North club Gloucester City on loan for the season. He went straight into the starting eleven and in his fourth appearance, after his team came back from 2–0 down to lead 3–2 at Kidderminster Harriers, he saved a late penalty and was named man of the match. He started in 10 of the first 12 matches of the league seasonhe was away on international duty for the other twobut then a broken hand kept him out until January 2020. After a couple of games for Birmingham U23s, he rejoined Gloucester City and made three more appearances in January before he was recalled by Birmingham to "explore other loan opportunities". No such opportunities occurred before the season was abandoned because of the COVID-19 pandemic.

He played in the first team's pre-season friendlies before the arrival of Andrés Prieto, who started the first competitive fixture of the season, in the 2020–21 EFL Cup at home to Cambridge United, with Jeacock on the bench. He was selected ahead of the injured Prieto and the newly arrived Neil Etheridge to start the opening match of the Championship season, at home to Brentford on 12 September. He kept a clean sheet as Birmingham won the match 1–0, after which Etheridge became first choice and Prieto second. Jeacock injured an ankle playing for Birmingham U23s, required surgery, and was out for much of the season. He made another four appearances for the U23s as they went on to win the Professional Development League title, but did not himself play in the final. He started the penultimate Championship match of the season, a 4–0 defeat at home to Cardiff City, in which new manager Lee Bowyer fielded a number of fringe players after relegation had been avoided. In July 2021, his contract was extended to run until 2024.

Salford City loan
After Birmingham signed Matija Sarkic on loan to cover Etheridge's recovery from COVID-19, Jeacock was allowed to leave on a season-long loan at League Two club Salford City, whose previous first-choice goalkeeper, Václav Hladký, had left the club. Jeacock began the season as backup to Tom King, and made his debut on 31 August in an EFL Trophy match against Oldham Athletic. He conceded once, to a Carl Piergianni header, and his side lost 1–0. With King away on international duty, Jeacock made his first league appearance four days later in a 2–1 defeat away to Carlisle United. Over the next four months, his only appearances were in the EFL Trophy, and on 11 January 2022, after Sarkic suffered a season-ending injury, Jeacock was recalled by Birmingham.

International career
Jeacock's first inclusion in an England squad came at under-19 level, for friendly matches in September 2019 in preparation for the Euro qualifiers later that year. He made his debut in the starting eleven for a 3–1 win against Greece on 5 September, and remained an unused substitute for the 1–0 defeat to Germany four days later. He was again part of the squad for friendlies against France and Belgium in October, and started in the second game, a 4–2 win in which he was dispossessed in his area for Belgium's first goal. A broken hand prevented him being considered for the qualifiers in November.

Career statistics

References

External links

2001 births
Living people
People from Bromsgrove District
English footballers
England youth international footballers
Association football goalkeepers
Birmingham City F.C. players
Stourport Swifts F.C. players
Gloucester City A.F.C. players
Salford City F.C. players
Midland Football League players
National League (English football) players
English Football League players
People educated at Bromsgrove School